Nawab Singh Chauhan (16 December 1909 – 4 April 1981) was an Indian politician. He was member of the 6th Lok Sabha from the Aligarh constituency. He used the pen name "Kanj" as poet.

Early life and education
Chauhan was born in the village Jawan Vajidpur and lived at Jawan Sikandarpur, Aligarh district. Wife Haripiari Devi to father Thakur Bulwant Singh, and was educated up to intermediate level.

Posts held
Notable posts Chauhan held include:
 Chairman, Zilla Parishad, Aligarh
 President, All-India, Railway Mail Service (R.M.S.)
 President, P&T Federation
 Member, All India Farmers Council (Bharat Krishak Samaj)
 Member, Uttar Pradesh Legislative Assembly (three years)
 Member, Rajya Sabha (11 years)

Memorial
The Nawab Singh Chauhan Gramodaya Inter College, in the Qasimpur Power House Colony, Aligarh district, is named after him.

References

1909 births
Indian National Congress politicians from Uttar Pradesh
Members of the Uttar Pradesh Legislative Assembly
People from Aligarh district
India MPs 1977–1979
1981 deaths
Chavan Nawab Singh
Uttar Pradesh district councillors
Lok Sabha members from Uttar Pradesh
Janata Party politicians
Bharatiya Lok Dal politicians